Short Hills Wildlife Management Area is a  Wildlife Management Area (WMA) in Rockbridge and Botetourt counties, Virginia.

History
Short Hills Wildlife Management Area was acquired by the Virginia Department of Game and Inland Fisheries (VDGIF) in July 2010, after the land was first secured by two non-governmental conservation organizations. Half of the WMA was initially purchased by the Virginia Outdoors Foundation, who paid $3 million for a portion of the tract before donating the land to VDGIF. The other half was first purchased by the Wildlife Foundation of Virginia; that parcel was subsequently purchased by VDGIF for $3 million, using Pittman–Robertson Federal Aid funds.

Although the acquisition was praised by conservation groups due to the parcel's protection of wildlife habitat and water resources, some members of the public vocally criticized the purchase due to the land's rugged nature and limited accessibility for public walk-in hunting. The long and often narrow area includes a single  stretch of land bordering public roads; the remainder is landlocked by private property.

Description
The majority of Short Hills WMA is located in Rockbridge County with the remainder in Botetourt County. The area also includes rocky karst topography. The headwaters of Cedar Creek, which flows through the nearby Natural Bridge rock formation, are located within the WMA.

The area is owned and maintained by the Virginia Department of Game and Inland Fisheries, and is open to the public for hunting, trapping, hiking, and primitive camping. Access for persons 17 years of age or older requires a valid hunting or fishing permit, or a WMA access permit.

, public access points remain limited to a  stretch of Plank Road (Virginia State Route 610) that borders the area. A small parking area off Plank Road has also been developed for public use.

See also
 List of Virginia Wildlife Management Areas

References

External links

Virginia Department of Game and Inland Fisheries: Short Hills Wildlife Management Area

Wildlife management areas of Virginia
Protected areas of Rockbridge County, Virginia
Protected areas of Botetourt County, Virginia